Black President is the sixth studio album by South African singer Brenda Fassie. It was released on March 9, 1990 by CCP Records. The album was her sixth release for the CCP Records and is her more political record to date.

Black President was generally received with favorable reviews by music critics. The album is especially notable because it features the Anti Apartheid anthem the title song of the albums Black President, a protest against the imprisonment of Nelson Mandela and  his comrades by the apartheid government.

Background

The songs from the album were written around Mandela's release from prison, who was held for 27 years for political activities by apartheid South African government.

Track listing
Adapted from Allmusic.

Personnel
Brenda Fassie - Lead vocalist
Richard Mitchell - Co-producer, Engineer
Rob Scrooby/Scrooby Do - Photography By, Design [Sleeve] 
Sello Chicco - Producer, Arranged By, Arranged By [Vocal]
Colbert Mukwevho - Additional writing (track 1)

References

1990 albums
Brenda Fassie albums
Songs about prison
Music in the movement against apartheid